In mathematics, an outer measure μ on n-dimensional Euclidean space Rn is called a Borel regular measure if the following two conditions hold:

 Every Borel set B ⊆ Rn is μ-measurable in the sense of Carathéodory's criterion: for every A ⊆ Rn,

 For every set A ⊆ Rn there exists a Borel set B ⊆ Rn  such that A ⊆ B and μ(A) = μ(B).

Notice that the set A need not be μ-measurable: μ(A) is however well defined as μ is an outer measure.
An outer measure satisfying only the first of these two requirements is called a Borel measure, while an outer measure satisfying only the second requirement (with the Borel set B replaced by a measurable set B) is called a regular measure.

The Lebesgue outer measure on Rn is an example of a Borel regular measure.

It can be proved that a Borel regular measure, although introduced here as an outer measure (only countably subadditive), becomes a full measure (countably additive) if restricted to the Borel sets.

References

Measures (measure theory)